Hearn or Hearne may refer to:

People
List of people with the surname Hearn, Hearne, Hearns or Hearnes

Hearn family, a family line of Anglo-Norman origin dating to 1066 A.D. in England

Heron (surname), the original spelling of the Hearn name, of Anglo-Norman origin

Places
 Hearn Generating Station, Toronto, Ontario, Canada
 Hearne, Saskatchewan, Canada
 Hearne, Texas, USA
 Hearnes Center, multi-purpose arena in Columbia, Missouri

Institutions
 Horace Hearne Institute for theoretical physics at Louisiana State University

See also
Heron (disambiguation)
Herne (disambiguation)